Sielc may refer to the following places:
 Sielc, Masovian Voivodeship (east-central Poland)
 Sielc, Podlaskie Voivodeship (north-east Poland)